When the Bough Breaks is a 1947 film directed by Lawrence Huntington and starring Patricia Roc and Rosamund John.  It is an adaptation of an original storyline by Herbert Victor on adoption and the competing ties of one child's birth and foster family.

Plot
After learning that her husband is a bigamist who already had a wife, new mother Lily Gardner (Patricia Roc) resolves to raise her baby, Jimmy, on her own under her maiden name of Lily Bates rather than give him up for adoption. Each day Lily leaves Jimmy at a day nursery while she works as a shopgirl at a department store, and then cares for Jimmy herself at night. Frances Norman (Rosamund John), a middle-class married woman who works at the day nursery to be around children after losing her own baby, is drawn to Jimmy. When Lily, under stress from her demanding schedule, becomes ill with flu, Frances persuades Lily to let her and her husband look after Jimmy temporarily. When Lily recovers, she visits Jimmy at the Normans' comfortable home. Seeing that Jimmy is happy and is receiving better food and care than she was able to manage, Lily agrees to let the Normans raise Jimmy, although she refuses to sign any legal document formally allowing them to adopt Jimmy. Lily eventually gives up on staying in touch with the Normans and drops out of Jimmy's life, although she misses him. The Normans do not tell Jimmy he is adopted and he regards them as his parents.

Eight years pass, during which time Lily rises to the level of manager at the department store and falls in love with a kind shopkeeper, Bill Collins (Bill Owen), who marries her and is willing to accept Jimmy as his own. Lily visits the Normans to reclaim Jimmy, now that she has the resources to take care of him, but the Normans refuse to give him up since Lily has not been part of Jimmy's life and he does not know he is not the Normans' natural child. A legal battle ensues, and the court awards custody of Jimmy to Lily due to the lack of any formal adoption agreement. Jimmy goes to live with Lily and Bill, but has trouble adjusting to life in a working-class household, and runs away in an attempt to return to the Normans, whom he considers his true "mummy and daddy". Bill, seeing that Jimmy is unhappy, persuades Lily to let him return to the Normans. Lily and Bill then have a baby of their own and are shown happily celebrating his birthday, while Jimmy celebrates his birthday with the Normans.

Cast
 Patricia Roc as Lily Bates 
 Rosamund John as Frances Norman 
 Bill Owen as Bill Collins 
 Brenda Bruce as Ruby Chapman 
 Patrick Holt as Robert Norman 
 Cavan Malone as Jimmy 
 Leslie Dwyer as George 
 Sonia Holm as Nurse 
 Torin Thatcher as Adams 
 Catherine Lacey as Almoner 
 Edith Sharpe as Matron
 Noel Howlett as Judge

Production
The film was the second in four films produced by Betty Box for Gainsborough with a total budget of £600,000. The first was Dear Murderer.

It was less glamorous than the typical Gainsborough melodrama, with no outfit worn by Patricia Roc costing more than £5. Roc played a working class role.

The house featured in the film was based on the real life house of Sydney Box.

Reception
The film received negative reviews. However it was popular and made a profit. Trade papers called the film a "notable box office attraction" in British cinemas in 1948.

References

External links

 
When the Bough Breaks at BFI
When the Bough Breaks at TCMDB

1947 films
Gainsborough Pictures films
Films directed by Lawrence Huntington
Films with screenplays by Muriel Box
Films with screenplays by Sydney Box
Films produced by Betty Box
Films scored by Clifton Parker
Films with screenplays by Peter Rogers
British black-and-white films
British drama films
1947 drama films
1940s British films